Beira was one of the six traditional provinces or comarcas of Portugal.

The territorial extension is different from that of the area called the Beiras, which refers to three provinces of 1936, Beira Alta, Beira Baixa and Beira Litoral.

Geography
The most important cities within the borders of the traditional province are: Coimbra, Aveiro, Leiria, Viseu, Castelo Branco, Guarda, Figueira da Foz, Covilhã and Pinhel.

The main river is the Mondego; other rivers include the Vouga, Dão, Côa, Zêzere and Paiva. The largest mountain range is Serra da Estrela – Continental Portugal's highest – other ranges being the Caramulo, Marofa, Gardunha, and Bussaco.

Administrative history
After the 15th Century, the new Kingdom of Portugal was divided into six great administrative units, referred to as comarcas. Since the Middle Ages  there existed the Beira Province.

1832
In 1832 this province was divided into
 Beira Alta
 Beira Baixa

1936
In 1936 these were divided among three provinces, one of which contained area that was not included in Beira Province:
 Beira Alta - "natural" regions of Beira Alta and Beira Transmontana
 Beira Baixa
 Beira Litoral 
Sometimes collectively referred to as the Beiras.

1976
In 1976 the provinces were abolished leaving only the 18 districts.
 Beira Alta Province:
 Guarda District
 Viseu District
 Beira Baixa Province:
 Coimbra District
 Castelo Branco District
 Beira Litoral Province:
 Aveiro District
 Coimbra District
 North of Leiria District

1976 postal code areas divide the region in
 Beira Interior
 Beira Litoral (postal region)

1998
Law 19/98 of 1998 divided the area into
 Beira Litoral
 Beira Interior

2011
The current Centro Region of Portugal covers roughly the same area. Oeste Subregion, part of Estremadura, is the  major exception. Among its twelve subregions three contain the name "Beira":
 Beira Interior Norte,
 Beira Interior Sul and
 Cova da Beira
The name also is contained in the name of many small towns and villages in the area, e.g. Moimenta da Beira, Celorico da Beira, Aguiar da Beira, Mondim da Beira etc.

Maps

See also

 Centro, Portugal
 Beira, Mozambique
 Prince of Beira, a former royal title
 Beiras wine region
 Administrative divisions of Portugal

Regions of Portugal